The Loner is a 1988 American TV film directed by Abel Ferrara.

Cast
John Terry
Vanessa Bell

References

External links
The Loner at BFI
The Loner at IMDb

1988 television films
1988 films
Films directed by Abel Ferrara